Greenwood railway station is a railway station on the Transperth network. It is located on the Joondalup line,  from Perth station serving the suburb of Greenwood.

History
The station was originally proposed as the Hepburn station under the Northern Suburbs Transit System Masterplan in 1989 to coincide with the Hepburn Heights development. The master plan placed the station as a future station until demand of the railway and suburbs warranted the construction of the station.

After being promised a number of times but not delivered, construction finally began in 2004 with the aim of reducing peak demand at the nearby Warwick and Whitfords stations, opening on 29 January 2005.

Services
Greenwood station is served by Transperth Joondalup line services.

Greenwood station saw 611,508 passengers in the 2013–14 financial year.

Platforms
Platforms currently in use are as follows:

Bus routes
Buses were provided at Greenwood station under trial by routes 451 to Kingsway Shopping Centre and 456 to Hillarys Boat Harbour, however both services were ultimately unsuccessful and withdrawn. Now the station is only served by rail replacement buses.

References

External links

Joondalup line
Railway stations in Perth, Western Australia
Railway stations in Australia opened in 2005
Transperth railway stations in highway medians